John Popham may refer to:
John Popham (died 1402), four times MP for Hampshire
John Popham (military commander) (c. 1395–c. 1463), English military commander and speaker-elect of the House of Commons
John Popham (judge) (1531–1607), Speaker of the House of Commons 1580–1583, Attorney General 1581–1592 and Lord Chief Justice of England
John Popham (MP for Winchester), MP for Winchester in 1714
John Popham (died 1638), English politician, MP for Bath